The black-headed night monkey (Aotus nigriceps) is a night monkey species from South America. It is found in Brazil, Bolivia and Peru. The A. nigriceps in Peru were notably inhabiting areas that were degraded, and often these areas were disturbed either by human activities or natural occurrences in the ecosystem.

Names
It is called ausisiti in the Kwaza language of Rondônia, Brazil, and nu’nu’ in the Shawi language of Peru.

Parasites
A. nigroceps suffers from Plasmodium brasilianum malaria. P. brasilianum was first found in A. nigroceps by Araújo et al 2013.

References

black-headed night monkey
Mammals of Brazil
Mammals of Bolivia
Mammals of Peru
black-headed night monkey
Taxa named by Guy Dollman